Fahamu Pecou (born June 25, 1975) is an American painter and scholar. He is known for producing works that combine aspects of Fine art and Hip-hop. Most of his works engage representations of black masculinity and identity.

Early life and education
Pecou was born in Brooklyn, New York, in 1975 to Alphonso Pecou and Betty Ann Ridges. His father's extended family had moved from Panama to Brooklyn, and his mother had moved with her brother from Hartsville, South Carolina. The couple met when she moved into an apartment in the brownstone that the Pecou family owned. Prior to Pecou's birth, Alphonso Pecou enlisted in the United Negro Improvement Association, and moved his family to Virgin Gorda before returning to Brooklyn.

When Pecou was four years old, his father murdered his mother after being diagnosed with schizophrenia and being repeatedly institutionalized. He and his siblings were sent to live with a relative in Hartsville, South Carolina, where he produced comic strips centered around the superhero, "Black Man."

Pecou graduated with a B.F.A in Painting and Digital Media from the Atlanta College of Art in 1997. He received his M.A. from Emory University's Institute of Liberal Arts in 2017 and his Ph.D. from Emory University in 2018.

Career

Pecou began his career as a graphic designer, producing materials for nightclubs, restaurants, and politicians as well as hip hop artists and music labels. While working with rap artists, Pecou began to consider the marketing strategies used in hip hop and applied those strategies to his own practice. His early paintings juxtaposed a street-savvy and in-your-face hip hop bravado with the more conservative art world. More recently, his paintings focus on contemporary representations of black masculinity and identity.

Pecou uses acrylic paint on canvas, video, music and performance art and academic writings to engage the complexities and convergences of hip-hop and black masculinity. His works display the spirit of modern-day Black America and also depict the history and culture of the African diaspora. They are known to be bold, bright and confrontational with inherent political undertone.

Notable series within Pecou's body of work include Pursuit of Happiness (2013), Imagining New Worlds (2015), Grav•i•ty (2014), I Know Why the Caged Bird Blings (2015) and Talking Drum (2016). Pecou's works are featured in major national and international galleries, museums and collections such as: the Smithsonian National Museum of African American History and Culture, the High Museum of Art,  Société Générale (Paris), Nasher Museum of Art at Duke University, Paul R. Jones Collection, Clark Atlanta University Art Collection, Museum of Contemporary Art of Georgia, and several others both in the private and public sectors.

Pecou engages in regular solo and group art exhibition across the globe. He also holds public lectures and speaking engagements at colleges and museums across the US. In addition to his own work, Pecou has curated notable exhibitions, including RiTES at the Zuckerman Museum at Kennesaw State University. In 2015, Pecou was selected by the City of Atlanta's Office of Cultural Affairs to curate ELEVATE Atlanta; the city’s annual public arts festival.

Starting in 2015, Pecou has also collaborated with the organizations WonderRoot, MARTA, Fulton County Arts and Culture, and the TransFormation Alliance to revitalize select MARTA stations by painting murals. The stations that will participate in this En Route program include the King Memorial, Oakland City, Hamilton E. Holmes, and Ashby stations. The goal of the project is to make the stations more inviting and encourage a sense of community. The project received $50,000 from the National Endowment for the Arts. So far, murals by Pecou have been painted at the King Memorial Station, the Ashby Station, and the Oakland City Station.

On Saturday, September 8, 2018, Pecou's studio was destroyed in a fire while he was traveling abroad.

Awards
 Caversham Fellowship, Atlanta, GA, 2008
 Working Artist Fellowship, Museum of Contemporary Art of Georgia, 2013-2014
 Artadia Award, Atlanta, GA, 2009
 Artist-in-Residence at McColl Center for Art + Innovation in Charlotte, North Carolina, 2010
 Emerging Artist Award, NBAF Impressions, 2011
 West Collects Prize, West Collection, 2012
Nellie Mae Rowe Fellowship, Hambidge Center for Creative Arts and Sciences, 2013
 Robert A. Paul Award, Emory University, 2015
Painters and Sculptors Award, Joan Mitchell Foundation, 2016

See also
 Fine art
 Virtual art
 The Art of Painting
 Art Papers
 José Parlá
 Museum of Contemporary Art of Georgia

References

External links
 

Living people
20th-century American painters
Atlanta College of Art alumni
1975 births
People from Brooklyn
21st-century American painters
Spelman College alumni